The fungi of the Dermocybe group, commonly known as skin-heads, form a group within the huge genus Cortinarius. They are generally considered to be a subgenus though some authorities consider them to form a genus in their own right.

They can be distinguished from other Cortinarius species by:
their brilliant colours, especially of the gills,
their non-hygrophanous dry cap, and
their dry cylindrical (non-bulbous) stem.

An example with a vivid green colour is Dermocybe austroveneta.  Another example is D. semisanguinea (pictured), which from above is an ordinary brown colour, but which shows a striking blood-red sheen when the underside of the cap is viewed. Lethal webcaps one of world's most poisonous mushrooms belongs to the group.

The Austrian Professor Meinhard Moser (1924-2002), whose book is referenced, was one of the authorities who promote Dermocybe to the status of a genus.

References
Meinhard Moser: Basidiomycetes II: Röhrlinge und Blätterpilze, Gustav Fischer Verlag Stuttgart (1978).  English edition:  translated by Simon Plant: Keys to Agarics and Boleti (Roger Phillips 1983)  

Cortinariaceae